Coniston, is a suburb of Wollongong in New South Wales.

Coniston is just north of the Port Kembla Steelworks and includes the Greenhouse Park, a one time waste pile converted into a natural park area with a weather station. The hill, known locally as "The Overseer" has a lookout over the city and Port Kembla. Coniston is also bordered to the west by the hill suburbs of Mangerton and Mount Saint Thomas.

Coniston has a variety of businesses including The Coniston Hotel, formally Gilmore's Hotel, a bakery, 24 Hour petrol station and several other specialty stores. Coniston has long been serviced with its own Bulk Billing Medical Centre, Coniston is also well known for its successful soccer club, Coniston juniors.

Sport 
Coniston is also home to the Coniston Juniors Football Club who play at McKinnon Park, north of the commercial district.

Transport 
Coniston railway station is the suburb's main train station.

Coniston has multiple bus stops which are served by Premier Illawarra.

Demographics 
In the 2016 Census, there were 2,268 people in Coniston. The most common ancestries were Australian 20.5%, English 20.1%, Macedonian 10.1%, Scottish 6.1% and Irish 5.8%. 64.3% of people were born in Australia. The next most common country of birth was The former Yugoslav Republic of Macedonia (now the Republic of North Macedonia) at 6.9%. 61.0% of people spoke only English at home. Other languages spoken at home included Macedonian 10.1%. The most common responses for religion in Coniston were No Religion 26.2%, Catholic 18.4%, Eastern Orthodox 15.0% and Anglican 9.4%.

See also
 Drummond Battery
 Greenhouse Park

References

External links
 Coniston Hotel.

Suburbs of Wollongong